Paul G. Summers (born March 28, 1950) served as attorney general of the state of Tennessee, United States, from 1999 through September 2006. He previously served as a Judge of the Court of Criminal Appeals (1990–1999) and as a District Attorney.

Summers declined to seek re-appointment when his term ended in 2006, and in October 2006 he joined the Nashville law firm Waller Lansden Dortch & Davis, LLP.

He had a long and distinguished career in the military, and was awarded the Legion of Merit and a Meritorious Service Medal with Oak Leaf Clusters.

Education
J.D., University of Tennessee College of Law, 1972
Bachelor's degree, Mississippi State University, 1968

Personal
Summers has one son, Paul I. Summers.

References

External links
Tennessee "blue book"

1950 births
Living people
Tennessee Attorneys General
Tennessee lawyers
United States Army officers
Mississippi State University alumni
University of Tennessee College of Law alumni
Recipients of the Legion of Merit